Tuckerman is a surname. Notable people with the surname include:

Bayard Tuckerman (1855–1923), American biographer and historian
Bayard Tuckerman, Jr. (1889–1974), American jockey, businessman, and politician
Bryant Tuckerman (1915–2002), American mathematician
Charles K. Tuckerman (1827–1896), American diplomat and writer
Edward Tuckerman (1817–1886), American botanist
Frederick Goddard Tuckerman (1821–1873), American poet
Herbert Tuckerman (1921–2007), American politician
Henry Theodore Tuckerman (1813–1871), American writer, essayist and critic
Joseph Tuckerman (1778–1840), American clergyman and philanthropist
Laurette Tuckerman (born 1956), French and American mathematical physicist
Nancy Tuckerman (1928-2018), American White House Social Secretary
Samuel Parkman Tuckerman (1819–1890), American composer
Stephen Salisbury Tuckerman (1830–1904), American painter

See also
Edward Tuckerman Potter (1831–1904), American architect